The Asian Taekwondo Union or WT Asia is the official governing body for Taekwondo in Asia as a regional organisation of World Taekwondo.

References

External links
 

National members of World Taekwondo
Taekwondo